Stephen Bishop may refer to:

 Stephen Bishop (actor) (born 1970), American baseball player and actor
 Stephen Bishop (cave explorer) (1821–1857), African American cave explorer
 Stephen Bishop (singer) (born 1951), American pop singer
 Stephen Kovacevich (born 1940), concert pianist, formerly named Stephen Bishop
 Stephen Bishop (born 1983), chaplain and potential candidate in Louisiana gubernatorial election, 2019
 Steven Bishop (born 1970), Australian drummer